Midea Group is a Chinese electrical appliance manufacturer, headquartered in Beijiao town, Shunde District, Foshan, Guangdong and listed on Shenzhen Stock Exchange. As of 2021, the firm employs approximately 150,000 people in China and overseas with 200 subsidiaries and over 60 overseas branches. Midea Group is listed on Shenzhen Stock Exchange since 2013. It has been listed on the Fortune Global 500 since July 2016. Midea produces lighting, water appliances, floor care, small kitchen appliances, laundry, large cooking appliances, and refrigeration appliances. It is the largest microwave oven manufacturer, and acts an OEM for many brands. It also has a long history in producing home and commercial products in heating, ventilation and air conditioning (HVAC). It is the world's largest producer of robots and appliances.

Since 2023, the manufacturer had been sanctioned by United States and European Union nation for suspecting of providing military supply to Russia for the assistance of war in Ukraine.

History
Starting with only CN¥5,000 to open a workshop for the production of bottle lids in Beijiao, Shunde in 1968, He Xiangjian, the founder of the company, has since turned Midea into one of the most successful private companies in China, with sales revenue for the entire Group declared at US$ 40.5 billion for 2020 financial year, as well as listed on the main board of the Shenzhen Stock Exchange.

After its initial period of manufacturing bottle lids and car parts, the company focused on the manufacture of fully finished goods; specifically, electric fans beginning in 1980.  Five years later, Midea produced its first air conditioner, a product which remains the core component of Midea's business today.  Over the following 15 years though, the company gradually expanded into a wide variety of other electrical home appliances, including refrigerators, washing machines, and microwave ovens.

In 1973, the subsidiary which handled the core businesses of the company, known as "Guangdong Midea Electric", proceeded with a public offering of shares on the Shenzhen Stock Exchange. The Guangdong Midea Electric's parent company, known today as "Midea Group", remained a privately held company at that time.

Midea opened its first overseas production facilities in 2007, in the Vietnam Industrial Park outside of Ho Chi Minh City. This would mark the beginning of a period of international expansion for the company. In 2008, Midea formed a manufacturing joint venture with Belarusian microwave producer Horizont (rus.), in order to break into the various CIS markets.

2010 would see the first of several overseas joint ventures between Midea and American air-conditioner manufacturer Carrier Corporation. Their first joint venture is based in Cairo, Egypt, under the name of Miraco Carrier. The next year, Midea and Carrier continued on this course, forming a collection of closely networked joint venture companies in Brazil, Argentina and Chile, and another one separately in India.

In August 2012, the board of Midea Group announced that the company's founder, He Xiangjian, had resigned as Chairman. Guangdong Midea Electric Chairman and President Paul Fang was named as the new Chairman of Midea Group.

A restructuring plan was announced in April 2013. In September 2013, the whole entity was publicly listed in the Shenzhen Stock Exchange as Midea Group.  At the same time, Guangdong Midea Electric was privatized by Midea Group.

At the end of 2014, the Chinese electronics giant Xiaomi invested CN¥1.2 billion by acquiring 1.2% shares of Midea Group. A cooperation between the two companies was also announced at the same time.

In 2016, Midea made three major acquisitions, the first of which was Toshiba's home appliances business for US$477 million, followed by the even larger purchase of KUKA, the German robotics company. Lastly, acquiring Eureka, the brand that specializes in floorcare, from Electrolux AB in December.

Products

Midea's main business is producing home appliances and commercial air conditioners. It sells products domestically under its own name, while the majority of its export business is as an OEM and ODM for many well-known global brands. In recent years, Midea has begun launching its own brand in a growing number of foreign markets, such as Brazil, Argentina, Chile, India, Egypt, and most countries in southeast Asia.

The company's main product category is air conditioners, both residential and commercial. It manufactures other major home appliances such as refrigerators, washing machines, and dishwashers. Midea also offers a wide range of smaller appliances, such as microwave ovens, kettles, water dispensers, and vacuum cleaners. It offers these products under its own brand, and manufactures them for sale under other brands (as an OEM), for example many microwaves are made by Midea, are internally similar but are sold under a multitude of different brands, with varying external designs.

Midea annually wins 40+ design awards across a variety of reputable global design shows such as Red Dot, iF and other design competitions.

Beyond Midea's eponymous brand name, the company also employs a series of other brands. The Little Swan brand was adopted when Midea acquired the Little Swan company in 2008. Little Swan products are mostly laundry and refrigeration appliances. Hualing is a brand used by Midea for air conditioners and refrigerators, and was also adopted in 2008. MDV is one of the brands used by Midea for its line of commercial air conditioners, active since 1999. The Pelonis brand is used for heaters.

The New York Times reported that Midea is the largest manufacturer of microwave ovens for several large brands, including Toshiba, Whirlpool, and Black+Decker.

Midea is also involved in manufacturing automotive parts — including electric water pumps, oil pumps, compressors and power steering motors — through its Welling subsidiary.

Projects

During the last decade, Midea has landed several increasingly high-profile projects, peaking with the most recent wins to install large-scale HVAC solutions in all the 12 stadiums for the Olympic games in Brazil in 2016, as well as 9 of 12 stadiums for the World Cup in Brazil in 2014.

Research and development

Recently, Midea has maintained a policy of scaling R&D by consistently reinvesting 4% of company-wide revenues back into research and development efforts.

In terms of intellectual property, Midea has been pursuing registration of its achievements in innovation more recently than before: the number of patent and utility applications made by Midea between 2000 and 2004 grew from 2 to more than 40.

References

External links

 

Companies listed on the Shenzhen Stock Exchange
Companies in the CSI 100 Index
Civilian-run enterprises of China
Shunde District
Companies based in Foshan
Manufacturing companies established in 1968
Electronics companies of China
Home appliance manufacturers of China
Home appliance brands
Chinese brands
Heating, ventilation, and air conditioning companies
Chinese companies established in 1968
Multinational companies headquartered in China
Industrial robotics companies
Industrial machine manufacturers
Amusement ride manufacturers
Pump manufacturers
Electric motor manufacturers
Engine manufacturers of China